Scopula mariarosae is a moth of the family Geometridae. It was described by Hermosa A. Expósito in 2006. It is found on Negros Island in the Philippines.

References

Moths described in 2006
mariarosae
Moths of the Philippines
Endemic fauna of the Philippines
Fauna of Negros Island